Paraheliophanus is a genus of Atlantic jumping spiders that was first described by D. J. Clark & P. L. G. Benoit in 1977. The name is a combination of the Ancient Greek "para", meaning "alongside", and the salticid genus Heliophanus.

Species
 it contains four species, found only on Saint Helena:
Paraheliophanus jeanae Clark & Benoit, 1977 – St. Helena
Paraheliophanus napoleon Clark & Benoit, 1977 – St. Helena
Paraheliophanus sanctaehelenae Clark & Benoit, 1977 – St. Helena
Paraheliophanus subinstructus (O. Pickard-Cambridge, 1873) (type) – St. Helena

References

Salticidae genera
Fauna of Saint Helena
Salticidae
Spiders of Africa